Fryderyk Monica (19 October 1937 – 17 February 1983) was a Polish footballer. He played in thirteen matches for the Poland national football team from 1959 to 1963.

References

External links
 

1937 births
1983 deaths
Polish footballers
Poland international footballers
Place of birth missing
Association footballers not categorized by position